The Philippine snubnose halfbeak (Melapedalion breve) is a species of halfbeak. It is a coastal species that originates from the South China and Sulu Seas around the Philippines and Malaysia. It grows to about  SL. It is the only member of its monotypic genus and was originally described as Oxyporhamphus brevis by Alvin Seale in 1910 with the type locality given as Paawacan, Palawan Island, Philippines.

References

Hemiramphidae
Monotypic fish genera
Fish described in 1910
Taxa named by Alvin Seale